The Associazione Sportiva Dilettantistica Hockey Marzotto Valdagno is a professional roller hockey team based in Valdagno, Italy. The team currently plays in the Serie A1 italian hockey championship, the most important roller hockey division in Italy.

History
The roller hockey section was founded on 1938 but due to the 2nd World War just in 1946, with the help of Giovanni Piazzon, the roller hockey had a real beginning. In terms of trophies in the last years Hockey Valdagno jump to the first positions of the Serie A1, and finally in 2009-10 edition was italian champion. In 2010 also hosted the European League Final Six, but lost the group phase.

Current Squad 2010-11
The names and numbers are established according to the official website   www.hockeyvaldagno.it.

Coach:  Jorge Valverde
2nd Coach:  Roberto Fanton
Physical trainer:  Lorenzo Pieropan

Famous players
 Diego Marchetto
 Angelo Noro
 Nils Hauert
 Luigi De Gerone
 Massimo Cunegatti

Honours
Serie A1: 3
 2009–10, 2011–12, 2012–13
Coppa Italia: 2
 2012–13, 2013–14
Supercoppa Italiana: 3
 2010, 2011, 2012

References

External links

Official website.

Roller hockey clubs in Italy
Sports clubs established in 1938